The 11th Glover Trophy was a motor race, run to Formula One rules, held on 15 April 1963 at Goodwood Circuit, England. The race was run over 42 laps of the circuit, and was won by British driver Innes Ireland in a Lotus 24, after polesitter Graham Hill suffered fuel injection problems while leading in his BRM.

Another Formula One race, the 1963 Pau Grand Prix, was also held on the same day.

Results

References
 "The Grand Prix Who's Who", Steve Small, 1995.
 "The Formula One Record Book", John Thompson, 1974.

Glover Trophy
Glover Trophy
20th century in West Sussex
Glover